D64 is a state road connecting the city of Pazin with D66 state road in Vozilići.

The D64 road thus serves as a connection between the central Istria and resorts along the eastern coast of Istria peninsula, including Opatija, Lovran and Ičići, as well as to Brestova ferry port, from which Jadrolinija ferries fly to island of Cres (via D402 state road). The northern terminus of the road also provides a link towards A8 motorway via two interchanges near Pazin - Rogovići and Ivoli.

The road, as well as all other state roads in Croatia, is managed and maintained by Hrvatske ceste, a state-owned company.

Traffic volume 

Traffic is regularly counted and reported by Hrvatske ceste, operator of the road. Substantial variations between annual (AADT) and summer (ASDT) traffic volumes are attributed to the fact that the road connects a number of summer resorts to Croatian motorway network.

Road junctions and populated areas

Sources

D064
D064